Li Guangyuan (born 27 February 1997) is a Chinese swimmer. He competed in the men's 100 metre backstroke event at the 2016 Summer Olympics.

Career best times

Long course (50-meter pool)

Short course (25-meter pool)

References

External links
 

 
 

1997 births
Living people
Swimmers from Zhejiang
Chinese male backstroke swimmers
Olympic swimmers of China
Swimmers at the 2016 Summer Olympics
People from Taizhou, Zhejiang
Swimmers at the 2014 Summer Youth Olympics
World Aquatics Championships medalists in swimming
Swimmers at the 2014 Asian Games
Swimmers at the 2018 Asian Games
Asian Games medalists in swimming
Asian Games gold medalists for China
Medalists at the 2018 Asian Games
Youth Olympic gold medalists for China
21st-century Chinese people